The Secaș (also: Secașul Mare) is a right tributary of the river Sebeș in Romania. It discharges into the Sebeș in Lancrăm.

Tributaries
The following rivers are tributaries to the river Secaș (from source to mouth):

Left: Ludoș, Apold, Dobârca, Pustia, Gârbova, Câlnic
Right: Sângătin, Boz, Daia

References

Rivers of Romania
Rivers of Sibiu County
Rivers of Alba County